The 2022 Moscow municipal elections took place in Moscow on 9–11 September 2022. Elections will take place for deputies of the municipal councils in most of the districts of Moscow, for a total of at least 1,502 seats. Although the post of municipal council member is relatively powerless, candidates for mayor of Moscow are required to obtain support from municipal deputies to stand in elections.

Last elections 

In 2017, in multiple districts in the center of Moscow, as well as some on the periphery of the city, the ruling party United Russia suffered defeats to opposition candidates, who received a combined total of nearly 20% of the seats. The opposition formed a coalition called United Democrats to get candidates elected to municipal councils of deputies.

Moscow
Elections in Moscow
Future elections in Russia